Christ Church is the parish church of the village of Broad Town in Wiltshire, England. Constructed between 1844 and 1846 as a late Commissioners' church, it remains an active parish church and is a Grade II listed building.

History
Historic England gives a construction date for the church of 1844–1846. The Wiltshire Pevsner records the architect as W. Hinton Campbell.

The cookery writer Jane Grigson is buried in the churchyard, alongside her husband, Geoffrey. The church remains an active parish church and holds regular services.

Architecture and description
The church is of ashlar Bath stone, with six bays and a bellcote. Pevsner describes Christ Church as "in the lancet style" and its Historic England designation records it as "a handsome building". The church is designated Grade II.

References

Sources
 
 

Church of England church buildings in Wiltshire
Grade II listed churches in Wiltshire
Churches completed in the 1840s